Sefton – a suburb of the City of Canterbury-Bankstown local government area—is located 23 kilometres west of the Sydney central business district, in New South Wales, Australia.  Part of the Western Sydney region, it shares the 2162 postcode with the neighbouring Chester Hill suburb.

History 

The name Sefton was taken from Sefton in Merseyside, England. Prior to subdivision, Sefton was an area of market gardens, orchards and poultry farms. It was the birthplace of property group Stockland in 1952, when founder Ervin Graf undertook a development project of 19 houses in the suburb.

Transport and commercial area

Sefton railway station is on the Bankstown Line of the Sydney Trains network. There is a small shopping centre clustered around it which is made up of Sefton Growers Market, Sefton Newsagency and a Thai/Australian bistro.

Schools 
Sefton Infants School is a small public school for years kindergarten to year 2 and pre-school. Sefton High School is a co-educational—partially selective—high school with just over 1,000 students. The selective-school section operates from years 7–10.  Years 11–12 are integrated into the community section of the school. Immaculate Heart of Mary Catholic School is a co-educational primary school catering from kindergarten to year 6 and is adjacent to the Immaculate Heart of Mary Church.

Sport and recreation 
A number of sporting facilities are located around Sefton. This includes Jensen Oval and Sefton Golf Course. Sefton Golf Course is a council-owned 18-hole par-3 course on 15.6 hectares and is open all year round.

Population
In the 2016 Census, there were 5,808 people in Sefton. 48.6% of people were born in Australia. The next most common countries of birth were Vietnam 14.0%, Lebanon 6.8% and China 5.0%. The most common reported ancestries were Lebanese 16.7%, Vietnamese 15.0%, Chinese 12.7%, Australian 10.4% and English 8.5%. 28.5% of people spoke only English at home. Other languages spoken at home included Arabic 19.9%, Vietnamese 17.8%, Cantonese 5.9% and Mandarin 4.2%. The most common responses for religion were Islam 25.8%, Catholic 20.6%, No Religion 15.3% and Buddhism 13.8%.

Politics
At the state level, Sefton is part of the electoral district of Bankstown. At the federal level, Sefton is part of the electoral Division of Blaxland.

Culture
In 2008, Sefton was a filming location for the international, award-winning and critically acclaimed television drama series East West 101.

References

External links

 Sefton Golf Course

Suburbs of Sydney
City of Canterbury-Bankstown
Muslim enclaves